Naked Wines is an online wine retailer founded by Rowan Gormley which launched in the UK on 1 December 2008. In 2015, the company was purchased by Majestic Wine, a British brick and mortar retailer.

History 
Naked Wines was founded by Rowan Gormley on 1 December 2008.

In March 2010, Naked Wines rolled out a pricing model called Advance Bookings at the London International Wine Fair. The model offers customers savings by ordering their wine in advance, with greater discounts the sooner the wine is ordered.

In May 2011, Advance Bookings was changed to a more direct approach titled Naked Marketplace. Marketplace allows prospective and established Naked Winemakers to promote their wines at a discounted price to Naked Wines' customer base. Customers can bid on a proposed case if they want it, and once the market exceeds a minimum volume then the deal goes into effect and the wines are shipped and delivered at pre-determined future dates.

On 10 April 2015, Naked Wines was acquired by Majestic Wine and Rowan Gormley was appointed CEO of the enlarged group.

Naked Wines and Majestic Wines parted ways in 2019 and are no longer affiliated.

Rowan Gormley resigned as CEO in 2019. The current CEO is the former COO Nick Devlin.
In 2019, Majestic announced that the business would be restructured. The 'Majestic' business, including the 200 stores, brand, Calais and on-trade arms, was sold to private equity firm Fortress Investment Group for £95m. Fortress re-hired John Colley as Chief Executive. Majestic Wines PLC was renamed to Naked Wines. Effectively, the previous shareholders of Majestic became shareholders of Naked Wines, and the Majestic business gained new shareholders.

Naked Wines is a publicly listed company. On the London Stock Exchange, the stock ticker is “Wine”.

Business model
Naked Wines' customers (called Angels) fund independent winemakers from around the world, in return for wines at self-described "wholesale prices." However, 
the Financial Times notes that most wines sold by Naked Wines are not available on the retail market, "making direct price comparisons virtually impossible", and most wines are priced "close to usual retail price". They currently ship wine throughout the United Kingdom, United States, and Australia.

Customers review their wines and interact with other customers while online; reviewers give the wines Likert-scale style scores out of five, a Yes/No to whether they would buy the wine again and a textual description. When prospective buyers look at a wine's page they will see previous customers' reviews, which helps them determine what they would like to try for themselves.

See also 
 Virgin Wines
 Majestic Wine

References

External links 
 

Companies based in Norwich
Wine retailers
Online retailers of the United Kingdom